Piatt's Landing was an early nineteenth century riverboat and ferry landing on the Ohio River in Boone County, Kentucky. It is located near Route 338 almost due west of downtown Union.  The landing and Winnfield Cottage, which no longer exists, were built by Robert Piatt, the grandfather of Civil War General Edward Canby.  Ferries owned by the Piatts crossed the Ohio River to Indiana at several points; Touseytown to Lawrenceburg, Rabbit Hash to Rising Sun, and East Bend to North Landing. (Shaffer, p. 42)  A number of the Piatts associated with this family also lived in Norwood, Ohio.

The name Piatt is of Italian origin, according to N. L. Lodge (p. 1), and the original spelling was Piatti. (Note: N.L. Lodge's work is not deemed reliable by many researchers. The name Piatt was FRENCH, and was originally spelled Piat. The family came from the Province of Dauphine, near Grenoble, France. Rene Piat LeFleur was a Huguenot refugee who emigrated in the 1670s. He first went to London, where he was "denizated" a British citizen. He later migrated to Long Island, where he married Elizabeth Sheffield, an Englishwoman. They settled in New Jersey. Virtually all Piatts in America are descended from them.)

See also 
 Anderson Ferry: current ferry also in Boone County
 National Register of Historic Places listings in Boone County, Kentucky

References
 James F. Shaffer, Piatt's Landing, East Bend, Boone County, Kentucky (Cincinnati:  Cincinnati Gas & Electric Co., 1978)  103 pages, plus index.
 N. L. Lodge, The Tribe of Jacob Piatt, ed. 3 (Springfield, Mo.:  Privately Published, 1934)  170 pages, plus index.

Notes

External links
"Piatt's Landing," Chronicles of Boone County, Boone County Public Library (KY)
The Piatts of East Bend, KY 1803 - 1865

National Register of Historic Places in Boone County, Kentucky
Geography of Boone County, Kentucky
Transportation in Boone County, Kentucky
Ferries of Kentucky
Former buildings and structures in Kentucky
Demolished but still listed on the National Register of Historic Places
1800 establishments in Kentucky
Crossings of the Ohio River
Water transportation buildings and structures on the National Register of Historic Places
Transportation in Ohio County, Indiana
Transportation in Dearborn County, Indiana
Water transportation in Indiana